Space I'm In is the debut album from the British rock band The Candyskins.  It contains their hit single "Submarine Song" and the title track was an MTV favourite. A video was also made for their cover of the Buffalo Springfield song For What It's Worth, directed by Samuel Bayer, whose video for Smells Like Teen Spirit by Nirvana had recently entered heavy rotation on MTV. The recording of the album was financed by Geffen Records, although the first single release was under the Long Beach label. The band were signed to Geffen by A&R man Tom Zutaut.

Reception

Dave Thompson wrote in his book Alternative Rock that the band "actually came up with something new" calling the music "sparkling pop rock tinged with psychedelia round the edges" with "thoughtful lyrics".  Steven McDonald of Allmusic calls the album "a nice solid production" that is "melodic, well-done and highly enjoyable".

Track list

Personnel
Nick Cope – vocals
Mark Cope – guitar
Nick Burton – lead guitar
Richard (Mini) Brown – bass guitar, banjo
John Halliday - drums

Charts
Billboard singles charts

References

The Candyskins albums
1991 debut albums
Geffen Records albums